Abrotanella rostrata is a species of cushion plant belonging to the family Asteraceae. This tiny plant, only reaching 5 cm in height, is restricted to rocky places in the high mountains of southern South Island, New Zealand. It can be distinguished from its congeners by the combination of white florets and distinctively beaked cypselae. It flowers in December and January.

This plant is considered threatened due to its limited range.

References

External links
 Abrotanella rostrata (Asteraceae, Senecioneae) - a new species for New Zealand

rostrata
Flora of the South Island
Plants described in 1996